Eryopiformes is a group of rhachitomi temnospondyl amphibians. Eryopiformes was named by the German paleontologist Rainer R. Schoch in 2013. He defined it as a node-based taxon to include Eryopidae and Stereospondylomorpha. Unlike previous analyses, a phylogenetic analysis he performed found no support for a monophyletic Euskelia, that is defined to include Dissorophoidea and Eryopidae (and also usually includes Zatracheidae), in relation to Stereospondylomorpha. In this analysis, Eryopidae and Stereospondylomorpha usually formed a monophyletic clade that excludes the clade formed by Zatracheidae and Dissorophoidea. Thus, he named this newly identified group as Eryopiformes.

References

 
Rhachitomes
Carboniferous temnospondyls
Permian temnospondyls
Triassic temnospondyls
Jurassic temnospondyls
Cretaceous temnospondyls